Guihua Subdistrict is a subdistrict and the seat of Hetang District in Zhuzhou, Hunan, China. The subdistrict has 2 villages and 4 communities under its jurisdiction. Its seat ia at East Xinhua Road (新华东路).

History
The subdistrict of Guihua was formed in 2005. In the year of 2005, Hetangpu ceased to be a separate township, it was divided to the other township-level divisions. Three villages of Guihua, Xintangpo and Daijialing from the township of Hetangpu, four communities of Guihua, Xinhe, Zhaojiachong and Xingyang from the subdistrict of Songjiaqiao were transferred to the newly formed subdistrict of Guihua.

Subdivisions
Guihua Subdistrict has 4 communities and 2 villages under its jurisdiction.

4 communities
 Xiangyang Community
 Xinhe Community
 Xizi Community
 Zhaojiachong Community

2 villages
 Daijialing Village
 Xingui Village (merging the former two villages of Guihua and Xintangpo in 2016, 2016年原桂花、新塘坡二村合并)

References

Hetang District
Towns of Hunan